Scatterbrain is a 1940 American comedy film directed by Gus Meins and written by Val Burton, Jack Townley and Paul Conlan. The film stars Judy Canova, Alan Mowbray, Ruth Donnelly, Eddie Foy Jr., Joseph Cawthorn and Wallace Ford. The film was released on July 20, 1940, by Republic Pictures.

Plot

Cast 
Judy Canova as Judy Hull
Alan Mowbray as J.R. Russell
Ruth Donnelly as Miss Stevens
Eddie Foy Jr. as Eddie MacIntyre
Joseph Cawthorn as Nicholas Raptis
Wallace Ford as Sam Maxwell
Isabel Jewell as Esther Harrington
Luis Alberni as Prof. DeLemma
Billy Gilbert as Hoffman
Emmett Lynn as Pappy Hull
Jimmy Starr as Joe Kelton
Matty Malneck as Orchestra Leader

References

External links
 

1940 films
American comedy films
1940 comedy films
Republic Pictures films
Films directed by Gus Meins
Films scored by William Lava
Films produced by Gus Meins
Films with screenplays by Jack Townley
American black-and-white films
1940s English-language films
1940s American films